Canyon is the 2007 album by Jimmy Ibbotson. Ibbotson is a former member of the Nitty Gritty Dirt Band.

Track listing
"Hummingbird" (Jimmy Ibbotson) - 8:00
"High Horse / Telluride" (Jimmy Ibbotson) - 4:48
"Train in the Canyon" (Jimmy Ibbotson) - 5:22
"Hello, I Am Your Heart" (Dennis Linde) - 2:40
"Let It Go" (Jimmy Ibbotson) - 4:57
"College D-18" (Jimmy Ibbotson) - 4:26
"LA Freeway" (Guy Clark) - 4:14
"Just Like Tom Thumb's Blues" (Bob Dylan) - 3:37
"Beck And The Baby" (Jimmy Ibbotson) - 3:35 
"Map To Heaven" (Jimmy Ibbotson) - 3:46
"Mrs. Hiss' House" (Jimmy Ibbotson) - 3:33
"Sad Old Man" (Jimmy Ibbotson) - 3:24
"Pauncha Lou Lou" (Jimmy Ibbotson) - 3:18
"Starting Line" (Brother Paul Thorn) - 1:39

Personnel
Tommy Crane - electric guitar
Richard Hathaway - base
Bryan Savage - sax and flute
Randy Utterbach - fiddle
Steve Johnson - banjo
Micheal Jude - bass
Jimmy Ibbotson - vocals, acoustic guitar, 8 stringed instruments, bass, keys, flute, drums, banjo

Train In The Canyon
with Joe Henry
Sad Old Man
with Micheal Cleverly

References
All information from album liner notes, unless otherwise noted.

2007 albums
Jimmy Ibbotson albums